Yiannos Ioannou (born January 25, 1966) is a former Cypriot football player.

Club career
He was one of the most successful strikers in Cyprus ever and because of that he was given the nickname "Mr Goal". Playing almost 20 years for APOEL, he won the Cypriot Championship 4 times, the Cypriot Cup 6 times  and the Super Cup 6 times too. In addition, he was the top scorer in Cyprus in the seasons 1985-1986 and 1992–1993, scoring 22 goals in each season.

Ioannou has the most appearances and goals in the history of APOEL, with 504 appearances and 264 goals in all competitions.

International career
Yiannos Ioannou had been also an important member of the Cyprus national football team, having 41 appearances and scoring 6 goals.

Managerial career
He served for many years as assistant manager for APOEL.

Honours

Club
APOEL
 Cypriot Championship: 1986, 1990, 1992, 1996
 Cypriot Cup: 1984, 1993, 1995, 1996, 1997, 1999
 Cypriot Super Cup: 1984, 1986, 1992, 1993, 1996, 1997

Individual
 Cypriot First Division Top Scorer: 1986

References

APOEL FC players
Cypriot footballers
Cyprus international footballers
Cypriot First Division players
Living people
1966 births
Sportspeople from Nicosia

Association football forwards